Loxophlebia imitata is a moth of the subfamily Arctiinae. It was described by Herbert Druce in 1884. It is found in Guatemala, Panama and Venezuela.

References

 

Loxophlebia
Moths described in 1884